Blow-Up is a soundtrack album by Herbie Hancock featuring music composed for Michelangelo Antonioni's film  Blow-Up released in 1966 on MGM Records. The album features performances by Hancock, trumpeters Freddie Hubbard and Joe Newman, alto saxophonist Phil Woods, tenor saxophonist Joe Henderson, guitarist Jim Hall, bassist Ron Carter and drummer Jack DeJohnette. Although Jimmy Smith is credited with playing organ on the album some sources claim it was actually Paul Griffin who was at the sessions. The liner notes to a 2000s CD release indicate that Hancock first recorded his score in London with British musicians, but rejected the results and re-recorded the music in New York with American jazz musicians. According to a Library of Congress listing, additional uncredited musicians at the New York sessions included Don Rendell on tenor sax and Gordon Beck on organ. London sessions are said to have involved Hancock, Rendell and Beck, along with Ian Carr on trumpet, Pete McGurk on acoustic bass, and Chris Karan on drums. Hancock is also listed as being the arranger and music director. 

The album also includes "Stroll On", a rewrite of Tiny Bradshaw's "Train Kept A-Rollin'", by the Yardbirds featuring both Jeff Beck and Jimmy Page on guitars.

A mono mix of this album (MGM E4447ST) features slightly longer versions of several songs. The CD of this soundtrack currently in print includes, along with Hancock's material, two Lovin' Spoonful songs recorded by British musicians, which are used as incidental music in the film, and two songs recorded by British rock act Tomorrow which were originally intended for use in the film. This CD also features an alternate take of "Bring Down the Birds."  The bassline to "Bring Down the Birds"  was sampled by Deee-Lite for their 1990 single "Groove is in the Heart."

Track listing 
 "Main Title from Blow Up" - 1:41  
 "Verushka (Part 1)" - 2:47  
 "Verushka (Part 2)" - 2:15  
 "The Naked Camera" - 3:27  
 "Bring Down the Birds" - 1:55  
 "Jane's Theme" - 5:02  
 "Stroll On" (Yardbirds) - 2:49  
 "The Thief" - 3:17  
 "The Kiss" - 4:17 
 "Curiosity" - 1:35  
 "Thomas Studies Photos" - 1:17
 "The Bed" - 2:39
 "End Title Blow Up" - 0:52

All compositions by Herbie Hancock except as indicated

Personnel 
 Herbie Hancock - piano, melodica
 Freddie Hubbard - trumpet
 Joe Newman - trumpet
 Phil Woods - alto saxophone
 Joe Henderson - tenor saxophone
 Jimmy Smith - organ
 possibly Paul Griffin - organ
 Jim Hall - guitar
 Ron Carter - bass
 Jack DeJohnette - drums
Except track 7 performed by the Yardbirds
 Jeff Beck - guitar
 Jimmy Page - guitar
 Keith Relf - harmonica, vocals
 Jim McCarty - drums
 Chris Dreja - bass

References 

Herbie Hancock soundtracks
1967 soundtrack albums
MGM Records soundtracks
Thriller film soundtracks